In algebraic topology and category theory, factorization homology is a variant of topological chiral homology, motivated by an application to topological quantum field theory and cobordism hypothesis in particular. It was introduced by David Ayala, John Francis, and Nick Rozenblyum.

References

External links 

Homological algebra